FC Iskra Novoaleksandrovsk is a Russian football team from Novoalexandrovsk. It played professionally for one season in 1992, taking 16th place in Zone 2 of the Russian Second Division. It has played on the lower amateur levels since.

External links
  Team history at KLISF

Association football clubs established in 1992
Football clubs in Russia
Sport in Stavropol Krai
1992 establishments in Russia